Methylohalomonas is a moderately halophilic and obligately methylotrophic genus of purple sulfur bacteria with one known species (Methylohalomonas lacus). Methylohalomonas lacus has been isolated from hypersaline lakes from the Kulunda Steppe in Russia.

References

Gammaproteobacteria
Bacteria genera
Monotypic bacteria genera